Siddique   (born 1 October 1959) is an Indian actor and producer, who works mainly in Malayalam cinema. Along with appearing in over 350 Malayalam films, he has also acted in Tamil, Telugu and Hindi language films. He is known for having played a wide range of starring and supporting roles, including comic characters, romantic leads, anti-heroes and villains.

Siddik  made his acting debut with the film Aa Neram Alppa Dooram (1985). He got a break with the comedy film In Harihar Nagar (1990). Due to its success, Siddik  acted in a variety of comic roles during the early-1990s in films such as Godfather,  Manthrikacheppu,  Simhavalan Menon, Kasargode Khadarbhai, Thiruthalvaadi, Mughamudra, Kunukkitta Kozhi, and Welcome to Kodaikanal. Siddik  turned to more serious roles with Asuravamsam and Lelam (both 1997). He also did a notable villain role in Sathyameva Jayathe (2001), which led to a succession of similar roles.

In 2004, he was awarded the Kerala State Film Award for Best Supporting Actor for his performances in Sasneham Sumitra and Choonda. Siddik  ventured into production by co-producing the film Nandanam (2002) under Bhavana Cinema. In 2013, he received the Nandi Special Jury Award for Naa Bangaaru Talli.

Personal life
Siddique was born on 1 October 1959 at Edavanakkad, in Ernakulam, Kerala, India. He was the youngest child in a family of three with an elder brother and a sister. He did his primary schooling in his hometown, Edavanakkad and completed a Diploma in Electrical Engineering from Government Polytechnic College, Kalamassery.

He then worked as an Electrical Engineer at Kerala State Electricity Board division at Thrissur, Kerala. After a few years of service at KSEB, he flew abroad to Riyadh, Saudi Arabia and worked there for a few more years.

His elder brother Adbul Majeed is also an actor who appears in Malayalam films.

Career
Siddik babu started his career in the late 1980s with minor roles. His major break came in 1990 when, along with Mukesh, Jagadeesh, and Asokan, he was cast as one of the heroes in In Harihar Nagar. The movie, directed by Siddique (director) and Lal, went on to become a huge box office success, starting a streak of similar low-budget comedy movies featuring the cast. Siddique became an essential part of such movies along with Mukesh and Jagadeesh. Films in the genre included Manthrikacheppu (1992), Simhavalan Menon, Kasargode Khadarbhai (1992), Thiruthalvadi (1992), Mughamudra (1992), Kunukkitta Kozhi (1992), Mookkillarajyathu (1991), Mimics Parade, Grihapravesam, Welcome to Kodaikanal, Kavadiyattam, KaattilethadiTheverude Aana, Marupuram,  Vaarafalam,  Mughachithram and Kinnaripuzhayoram. He was cast alongside leading actresses of the time like Parvathy, Shobana, Sunitha, Mathu, and Suchithra. His performance in Godfather by Siddique-Lal was positively received by Malayalam movie viewers. Siddique also did action roles in some films. For example, there is the case of Ayalathe Adheham, where he was actually the villain only to be revealed at the climax of the movie. In Ekalavyan he played the role of Sarath, a young police officer, supporting Suresh Gopi.

His talent lies in how an actor should keep reinventing to be in Malayalam movie biz - learning from his experience and mistakes. His career curve shows a good inclination towards adapting to a variety roles - comedy, villain, character roles and so on. He is one among the artists who rose from junior artist level to a major actor with his talent and hard work.

1990s
The mid-1990s did not go well for Siddik as a number of personal problems affected his career. He made a comeback in the late 1990s with supporting roles in Asuravamsam with Manoj K. Jayan, and in Lelam and Crime File (both with Suresh Gopi). These films ensured his return to the mainstream. In Sathyameva Jayathe, he played a cold-blooded villain with Suresh Gopi. Following the success of this film, Siddique was offered a number of opportunities to play villains.

During this period, he also acted in television serials. His role in Sthree with Vinaya Prasad was a huge hit among Malayalam television audiences. He also anchored a musical programme called Sallapam on Doordarshan. Siddique has also anchored other musical programmes including Sangeetha Samagamam in Amrita TV and Symphony in Kairali TV, in the 2000s.

2000s
In 2002, he produced Nandanam, directed by Ranjith. The movie featured young actors Prithviraj Sukumaran and Navya Nair. Siddique appeared in a small but completely different role in the film. This was a box-office hit despite the absence of major stars.

Siddique started appearing in a number of different looks in his later films. This can be seen in films such as Chota Mumbai, Hallo, Nadiya Kollappetta Rathri, Udayon, Vellinakshatram, The Tiger, and Alibhai.

He encouraged director Lal to create the sequel to In Harihar Nagar. The movie 2 Harihar Nagar was released in 2009 with the middle-aged actors Jagadeesh, Mukesh, and Asokan coming together.  Again in 2010, he appeared in the series' third installment, In Ghost House Inn.

In April 2011, Siddique launched Kerala's first family magazine Family Facebook. Siddique is the editor of the monthly magazine that is rich with stories of the players in the Malayalam film industry – actors, directors, playback singers and others.

Awards

Other Awards
2008: Kairali World Malayalee Council Malayalam Film Award for Best Villain (Twenty:20, Madambi)
2009: Asiavision Annual Television Award Dubai for Best Musical Programme Presenter (Sangeetha Sangamam, Amritha TV)
2012: Naval Base Kerala Library Singalore's "Simhapuri Award" for the contribution to the Art and Culture

Filmography

As an actor
More than 350 films

Malayalam

Other languages

As voice actor

Producer
 Bada Dosth (2006)
 Nandanam (2002)

Television
TV shows as host
 Sallapam (Doordarshan) 
 Samagamam (Amrita TV)
 Sangeetha Samagamam (Amrita TV) 
 Symphony (Kairali TV)
Pachakuthira (Kairali TV)
TV serials as actor
 Sthree (Asianet)
 Chila Kudumba chitrangal (Kairali TV)
 Black and White (Asianet)
 Vava (Surya TV)
 Innale (Asianet)
Sindhooram (Asianet)
 Samasya ( DD Malayalam)
 Annu Mazhayayirunu (Amrita TV)
Nokketha Doorathu (Asianet)
 Sthree (part-2) (Asianet)

References

External links

 
 Siddik  at MSI
 Siddik : Filmography by year
 An interview with Siddique (in Malayalam)
 Siddik 's movies in Malayalam Movies
 Simhapuri Award for Siddik 

1959 births
Living people
20th-century Indian male actors
21st-century Indian male actors
Film producers from Kochi
Indian male film actors
Indian male television actors
Kerala State Film Award winners
Malayalam film producers
Male actors from Kochi
Male actors in Malayalam cinema
Male actors in Malayalam television